Dora G. Alcala serves on the Texas State University System Board of Regents. She is a former mayor of Del Rio, Texas.  She served three terms before losing the 2006 mayoral election to Efrain Valdez.

External links
Texas State University System biography page

Year of birth missing (living people)
Living people
People from Del Rio, Texas
Hispanic and Latino American mayors in Texas
Hispanic and Latino American politicians
Hispanic and Latino American women in politics
Mayors of places in Texas
Texas State University System
21st-century American politicians
21st-century American women politicians
Women mayors of places in Texas